Erukkur is a village located nearby Sirkazhi in Mayiladuthurai district, Tamil Nadu, India. It is located just 10 km from the Bay of Bengal; 5 km from Kollidam; 20 km from Chidambaram; 250 km from Chennai and 80 km from Pondicherry.

Agriculture and Fishing forms the backbone of the Sirkazhi economy. Tourism is another major institution.

External links
 http://www.ourladyofvoyageshrine.org/

Villages in Mayiladuthurai district